Şcoala was a magazine from Czernowitz, Austria-Hungary, founded in 1907 by George Tofan.

References

External links 
George Tofan

Publications established in 1907
Publications disestablished in 1907
Romanian-language newspapers
Mass media in Austria-Hungary
Mass media in Chernivtsi